Eti Lesmina Tantra (born 14 October 1975), is an Indonesian badminton player of Chinese descent. She has represented Indonesia and the United States in international tournaments.

Career 
Tantri who affiliate with Tangkas club, was selected to join the national team in 1993. She won her first title in 1997 India Open in the women's doubles partnered with Cynthia Tuwankotta. Together with Tuwankotta, she also won the 1997 French Open, becoming the first Indonesians to win a women's doubles title, and at the 1997 Polish Open. Tantri and Tuwankotta were the bronze medalists at the 1997 and 1999 Asian Championships. She claimed the gold medal for the Indonesian women's team and women's doubles (with Tuwankotta) at the 1999 Southeast Asian Games. Tantri competed in 2000 Olympic Games in Sydney with Tuwankotta as the eight seeds, but they were eliminated in the quarterfinals, defeated by Ge Fei and Gu Jun. Partnered with Minarti Timur, she won the women's doubles silver medal at the 2000 Asian Championships. In the mixed doubles, she won the 1997 Polish Open with Flandy Limpele, also the 2002 and 2003 U.S Open with Tony Gunawan. She was part of the national team that won the bronze medal at the 2000 Uber Cup, also the silver and bronze medals at the 2001 and 1999 Sudirman Cup.

Personal life 
Tantri married Tony Gunawan, a 2000 Olympic Games men's doubles gold medalist, on the 29th of July 2002 at the Monte Carlo Chapel in Las Vegas. They have two sons, Christopher and Leon.

Achievements

Asian Championships 
Women's doubles

Southeast Asian Games 
Women's doubles

IBF World Grand Prix
The World Badminton Grand Prix sanctioned by International Badminton Federation (IBF) since 1983.

Women's doubles

Mixed doubles

IBF International
Women's doubles

References

External links 
 
 

1975 births
Living people
Sportspeople from Riau
Indonesian people of Chinese descent
Indonesian female badminton players
Indonesian emigrants to the United States
American people of Chinese-Indonesian descent
American female badminton players
Badminton players at the 2000 Summer Olympics
Olympic badminton players of Indonesia
Competitors at the 1999 Southeast Asian Games
Southeast Asian Games gold medalists for Indonesia
Southeast Asian Games medalists in badminton
21st-century American women